The following is the qualification system and qualified athletes for the judo at the 2019 Pan American Games competitions.

Qualification system
A total of 140 judokas qualified to compete at the games. The top nine athletes (one per NOC) in each weight category's ranking after four qualification tournaments qualified along with one spot per category for the host nation, Peru. Each nation can enter a maximum of 14 athletes (seven men and seven women).

Qualification timeline

Qualification summary
The following is a list of qualified countries and athletes per event. A total of 25 countries qualified judoka.

Men

60 kg

66 kg

73 kg

81 kg

90 kg

100 kg

+100 kg

Women

48 kg

52 kg

57 kg

63 kg

70 kg

78 kg

+78 kg

References

Qualification
2019
Qualification for the 2019 Pan American Games
American Games, Qualification